Two new sports venues opened up in Hamilton, Ontario in 2007-08, both of which are on the McMaster University grounds. The first is the $23-million Ronald V. Joyce Stadium, and the second is the $30-million David Braley Athletic Centre. New facilities will become part of the city's sports facility inventory as Hamilton prepares a joint bid for the 2015 Pan American Games with the city of Toronto.

The 6,000-seat Ronald V. Joyce Stadium is primarily a football stadium, with officials at McMaster University suggesting it may be the best soccer venue in the Golden Horseshoe after Toronto's BMO Field. It has tried to position the stadium for extensive soccer use. Extensive renovations were also done to the gym at the Ivor Wynne Centre. Total cost of the upgrades was $54 million. University officials have also noted that previous successful Pan Am and Commonwealth Games in Winnipeg, Victoria and Edmonton have utilized university facilities. Mac officials are also aiming to make the university one of the athlete villages.

Below is a list of sports venues found in Hamilton, Ontario.

Ice arenas

Hamilton Arena Listing:

Barton Street Arena (demolished in 1977)
Chedoke Twin Pad Arena (2 rinks)
FirstOntario Centre
Dave Andreychuk Mountain Arena & Skating Centre
Hamilton Doublerink Arena (2 rinks)
Mohawk 4 Ice Centre (4 rinks)

Stadiums

A.A.A. Grounds, is a park that was home to the Hamilton Tiger-Cats from 1872-1949.
Bernie Arbour Memorial Stadium, 3,000 seater at the Mohawk Sports Park
Ivor Wynne Stadium, 30,000 seater. Now the site of the current Tim Hortons Field. Former home of the CFL Hamilton Tiger-Cats.
Tim Hortons Field 24,000 seat stadium. Current Home of the Hamilton Tiger-cats
Brian Timmis Stadium, 5,000-seat soccer stadium.
Ron Joyce Stadium (McMaster University), 6,000 seat stadium, opened in 2007.

Athletic centres

David Braley Athletic Centre (McMaster University), opened in 2007

Race tracks

Flamboro Downs, Canada's fastest half-mile harness horse racing track.
Flamboro Speedway, 1/3-mile semi banked asphalt oval auto racing track. It was established in 1961 and has provided excellent grass roots stock car racing action every year since, making it one of Canada's longest-running stock car tracks.

Marinas
 Royal Hamilton Yacht Club

References

Hamilton
Venues